The Gracie Family is a prominent martial arts family originally from Belém, state of Pará, Brazil whose ancestors came from Paisley, Scotland. They are known for creating the self-defense martial arts system of Gracie Jiu-Jitsu, also known as Brazilian Jiu-Jitsu.

They have been successful in combat sports competitions for over 80 years, representing their self-defense system (Gracie Jiu-Jitsu) including mixed martial arts (MMA), Vale tudo and submission wrestling events. Several members were involved in the creation of the Ultimate Fighting Championship (UFC), along with promoter Art Davie.

As a family, the Gracies upheld the "Gracie Challenge", a martial arts challenge intended to showcase the effectiveness of their style of jiu-jitsu against other martial arts disciplines. Members have an affinity to, and are consanguineously related to, the Machado family.

Jiu-Jitsu

Gastão Gracie from Rio de Janeiro, the grandson of George Gracie through his son Pedro, married Cesarina Pessoa Vasconcellos, the daughter of a wealthy Ceará family, in 1901 and decided to settle in Belém do Pará. Gastão Gracie became a business partner of the American Circus in Belém. In 1916, the Italian Argentine Queirolo Brothers staged circus shows there and presented Mitsuyo Maeda, a Japanese judoka and prizefighter. Gastão Gracie was also responsible for helping Maeda establish a Japanese community in Brazil. In 1917, Carlos Gracie, the eldest son of Gastão Gracie, watched a demonstration by Mitsuyo Maeda at the Da Paz Theatre and decided to learn judo. Mitsuyo Maeda, also known as Conde Koma thus accepted to teach Gastão's son Carlos as a thank you to Gastão for helping him get settled. In 1921, however, following financial hardship and his own father Pedro's demise, Gastão Gracie returned to Rio de Janeiro with his family.

Maeda's teachings were then passed on through local Rio de Janeiro coaches to Carlos and his brothers Oswaldo, Gastão Jr., George, and Hélio. There's a version saying that Hélio was too young and slow at that time to learn the art and due to his medical imposition was prohibited from physically partaking in training, but it is now known that he became a coxswain for the local rowing team as well as a competitive swimmer. Hélio successfully learned the art of Jiu Jitsu by watching his older brothers train, but due to his fragile condition instead of using pure strength Hélio learned to use leverage and specific body movements to successfully submit his opponents. Therefore, today Hélio Gracie is considered the man responsible for developing Brazilian jiu-jitsu into what it is today.

For a number of years, the Gracie family ran a competitive monopoly on vale tudo events. Through their competitive rise, the men allocated power and influence with which they sought to promote Gracie family members within the vale tudo community.

Roger Gracie won the World Jiu-Jitsu Championship 10 times in various weight divisions (6 times at 100 kg, once at 100+kg, and 3 times in the Absolute division). He also won the Pan-American Championship in the Absolute division in 2006 and the European Championships in 2005 in the 100+kg and Absolute divisions. He was also the first person to be inducted into the ADCC Hall of Fame.

Kron Gracie won the ADCC Submission Wrestling World Championship in the under 77 kg division in 2013 and the European Championships in the 82 kg division in 2009.

Clark Gracie won the Pan-American Championship in the under 82 kg division in 2013.

Kyra Gracie was the first female member of the family to compete. She won the ADCC Submission Wrestling World Championship in the Women's under 60 kg division in 2005, 2007, and 2011 and the World Jiu-Jitsu Championship four times (three times in the Women's under 64 kg division and once in the Women's Absolute Division). She became the first woman inducted into the ADCC Hall of Fame as a result of her achievements in the sport.

Gracie Jiu-Jitsu philosophy
The Gracie philosophy goes beyond the application of simply submitting opponents. The Gracie philosophy prepares practitioners for life, enabling them to live a healthy life and use their body and mind to its full potential. The philosophy promotes a life free of drugs, alcohol, and cigarettes. The reason being that taking care of your body is crucial in reaching your full potential in Jiu Jitsu. Staying connected with family and friends is also a must in the family's philosophy, as it develops mental and spiritual strength among practitioners. Jiu Jitsu to the Gracie's is a way of life, that had been established by founders of Brazilian jiu-jitsu (BJJ), Grand Masters Carlos and Hélio Gracie.

Ultimate Fighting Championship

In the early 1990s, Rorion Gracie collaborated with promoter Art Davie to create an eight-man single-elimination tournament for the purpose of showcasing the effectiveness of Gracie jiu-jitsu against other martial arts. The tournament would be no-holds-barred combat, much like the vale tudo matches the family had participated in for years in Brazil. The event was to be televised and would aim to publicly determine the best martial art.

The inaugural tournament took place on November 12, 1993. Rorion's younger brother Royce served as a combatant in the tournament, representing the family's martial art. Despite being the smallest competitor, Royce was able to win all three of his matches, and was crowned champion.

As more events were held, Royce would go on to win two more early UFC tournaments. His victories brought widespread attention to the family's style of jiu-jitsu, attracting many martial artists, especially in America, to begin training the art that proved so effective against the various styles showcased in the early UFC tournaments.

The Gracie triangle
The Gracie triangle is considered by some to be the symbol of Jiu-Jitsu, and can be traced back to the first Brazilian jiu-jitsu (BJJ) academies which were operated by Carlos and Hélio Gracie. The triangle symbol came into existence when the two brothers Carlos and Hélio were photographed demonstrating a specific technique. The way their bodies were shaped during the demonstration formed a perfect triangle. This same photograph was later used as the cover of the first book written by Carlos Gracie, and featured detailed information about fundamental attacks and defenses in BJJ. The triangle then became a symbol of the Gracie family and much more. Each side of the triangle represents an element of Gracie Jiu-Jitsu of which each BJJ athlete must focus: mind, body, and spirit.

Politics
Gracie family patriarch Hélio Gracie was a member of the Brazilian movement Integralism, which first appeared in Brazil in 1932. Today, many members of the Gracie family are also close to Brazilian President Jair Bolsonaro, who received an honorary black belt from Robson Gracie in 2018.

Family members

Family tree

Notable members of the Brazilian Gracie family include:

First generation
 Carlos Gracie Sr. (d. 1994)
 Hélio Gracie (d. 2009)

Second generation
 Carlos Gracie Jr.
 Carlson Gracie (d. 2006)
 Rickson Gracie
 Robson Gracie also known as Carlos Robson Gracie
 Rolls Gracie (d. 1982)
 Rorion Gracie
 Royce Gracie
 Royler Gracie

Third generation
 Cesar Gracie
 Clark Gracie
 Kron Gracie
 Ralph Gracie
 Renzo Gracie
 Rodrigo Gracie
 Roger Gracie
 Rolles Gracie, Jr.
 Ryan Gracie (d. 2007)

Fourth generation
 Kyra Gracie
 Neiman Gracie

See also
 Gracie (name)
 List of notable Brazilian Jiu-Jitsu practitioners
 Gracie jiu-jitsu ranking system
 The Gracies and the Birth of Vale Tudo

References

External links
Gracie US website
International Gracie Jiu-Jitsu Federation
Carlos Sr. vs Helio: The Truth About the Gracie Family History and Politics - Jiu-Jitsu School Time 
Welcome graciebarracarlsbad.com - Justhost.com

 
Brazilian practitioners of Brazilian jiu-jitsu

Mixed martial arts in Brazil